Batophora oerstedii is a species of algae in the family Dasycladaceae. It is the type species (holotype) of the genus Batophora.

References

Dasycladaceae